Steve Breitkreuz (born 18 January 1992) is a German professional footballer who plays as a defender for SSV Jahn Regensburg. He is the twin brother of fellow footballer Patrick Breitkreuz.

Career
Breitkreuz joined Erzgebirge Aue from Hertha BSC II in 2015. On 1 June 2017, Eintracht Braunschweig announced the signing of Breitkreuz on a three-year contract. A year later, he returned to Aue for the 2018–19 season having signed a three-year contract. In summer 2021, he joined SSV Jahn Regensburg.

References

External links
 
 

1992 births
Living people
German footballers
Footballers from Berlin
Association football defenders
2. Bundesliga players
3. Liga players
FC Erzgebirge Aue players
Eintracht Braunschweig players
Hertha BSC II players
SSV Jahn Regensburg players